Hastings College is a private Presbyterian college in Hastings, Nebraska.

History 
The college was founded in 1882 by a group of men and women seeking to establish a Presbyterian college dedicated to high academic and cultural standards.  Hastings College has been accredited by the Higher Learning Commission's North Central Association of Colleges and Schools since 1916.

Campus 
The college's first building was McCormick Hall, constructed in 1883 and still in use today. More recent additions include the Jackson Dinsdale Art Center, built in 2016; Osborne Family Sports Complex/Fleharty Educational Center, built in 2002; the Bronco Village student apartments (2005); the Morrison-Reeves Science Center, opened in late 2009. McCormick Hall was listed on the National Register of Historic Places in 1975, and the Hastings College Historic District designation, made in 2017, includes 12 buildings on campus for their historic significance in the College’s post World War II growth.

Athletics 
The Hastings 24 athletic intercollegiate varsity teams are called the Broncos. The college is a member of the National Association of Intercollegiate Athletics (NAIA), primarily competing in the Great Plains Athletic Conference (GPAC) since the 1969–70 academic year.

Notable alumni and faculty 
 Clayton Anderson, astronaut
 Bill Barrett, Nebraska politician
 Milan D. Bish, United States Ambassador
 Marc Boerigter, NFL and CFL wide receiver
 Yoo Chang-soon, Prime Minister of South Korea in 1982
 Mary W. Gray, mathematician and author
 Michael Hancock, mayor of Denver, Colorado
 Tony Hobson, coach at Fort Hays State University
 Tom Osborne, U.S. Representative from Nebraska
 Bill Parcells, NFL coach 
 Ivy Ruckman, author
 Akeem Ward, former men's soccer All-American; current MLS soccer player at D.C. United
  Ernesto Lacayo, Xtreme Football League (XFL), Indoor Football League (IFL) Kicker

References

External links 
 Official website
 Official athletics website

 
Buildings and structures in Hastings, Nebraska
Universities and colleges affiliated with the Presbyterian Church (USA)
Educational institutions established in 1882
Education in Adams County, Nebraska
1882 establishments in Nebraska
Great Plains Athletic Conference schools
Historic districts in Nebraska
National Register of Historic Places in Adams County, Nebraska
Private universities and colleges in Nebraska